Ophisops elbaensis, the Mount Elba snake-eyed lizard, is a wall lizard in the family of true lizards (Lacertidae). It is found in Sudan, Egypt, Saudi Arabia, and Yemen.

References 

Ophisops
Reptiles described in 1957
Taxa named by Karl Patterson Schmidt
Taxa named by Hymen Marx